Michael Colin Spreitzer (born February 10, 1981) is an American musician, producer, mixing engineer, and the lead guitarist of heavy metal band DevilDriver. He is the second-longest lasting member following the departures of all original members except vocalist Dez Fafara. He replaced original lead guitarist Evan Pitts in 2004. Spreitzer co-wrote and performed on DevilDriver's albums The Fury of Our Maker's Hand (2005), The Last Kind Words (2007), Pray for Villains (2009), Beast (2011) Winter Kills (2013) Trust No One (2016), Outlaws 'til the End: Vol. 1 (2018), and Dealing with Demons Vol. 1 (2020).

Biography 

In 2001, Spreitzer joined a local heavy metal band from Santa Barbara called Grolby alongside future DevilDriver band mates John Boecklin, Jon Miller, and Jeff Kendrick. Unfortunately, Grolby broke up eight months after Spreitzer joined. At this point, Spreitzer went on to form an industrial metal band called No Love Lost with friends Cliff Ross and Dan Bellinger. Although an album's worth of material was written and recorded, nothing was ever released.

In April 2004, DevilDriver was about to embark on their first European tour opening for Swedish heavy metal band In Flames. Two days before the tour began, DevilDriver's guitarist Evan Pitts was forced to withdraw from the tour due to personal reasons, leaving the band without a second guitar player. At the time, Jon Miller and Jeff Kendrick lived with Spreitzer when not touring with DevilDriver. When Spreitzer heard that Pitts would not be going on the European tour he immediately offered to fill in temporarily for the duration of the tour. Shortly after DevilDriver returned to Santa Barbara, Pitts had decided not to continue with the band and Spreitzer became a permanent member.

Since joining DevilDriver in 2004, Spreitzer has continued to tour with the band and contribute on the albums The Fury of Our Maker's Hand, The Last Kind Words, Pray for Villains, Beast, Winter Kills, Trust No One, and Outlaws 'til the End: Vol. 1. He has also written and recorded music for small movie projects including the documentary Tokyo Comedy Store (Director: Brian Christopher Anderson) that has been featured on the Documentary Channel in the United States. In 2009, Spreitzer co-wrote three songs featured on the video game MX vs ATV Reflex soundtrack alongside Raymond Herrera, Christian Olde Wolbers, and Jeff Kendrick.

In 2012, Spreitzer worked with London-based alternative rock band Esoterica and featured on their debut single, "We Are Watching You", from their new album, Nothing Left to Lose.

Discography

DevilDriver
The Fury of Our Maker's Hand (2005)
The Last Kind Words (2007)
Pray for Villains (2009)
Beast (2011)
Winter Kills (2013)
Trust No One (2016)
Outlaws 'til the End: Vol. 1 (2018)
Dealing with Demons Vol. 1 (2020)
Dealing with Demons Vol. 2 (TBA)

Studio albums

EPs

Singles

Compilations

Other
Tokyo Comedy Store (2008)
MX vs ATV Reflex (2009)

References

1981 births
21st-century American guitarists
21st-century American male musicians
American male guitarists
American rock guitarists
Lead guitarists
Living people